Jon Gilbert may refer to:

 Jon Gilbert (journalist), freelance British journalist
 Jon Gilbert (bibliographer) (born 1972), English bibliophile, historian and bibliographer of Ian Fleming